Ramón Álvarez Palomo (March 7, 1913 - November 14, 2003) was an Asturian anarcho-syndicalist and one of the key figures in the Revolution of 1934 and the establishment of the General Confederation of Labor (CGT).

Biography
Ramón Álvarez Palomo was born in Gijón, on March 7, 1913, he had five brothers and his father was a member of the National Confederation of Labor (CNT). He began working as a baker at the age of 12, after being educated at the rationalist school of Eleuterio Quintanilla. In 1928 he joined the CNT himself, where he met Segundo Blanco and Avelino González Mallada. At the age of twenty, he was elected secretary of the Gijón bakers section and, in July 1933, also general secretary of the CNT of Asturias, León and Palencia.

Revolution
He was one of the Asturian leaders of the anarchist insurrection of January 1933 and was locked up in jail, where he met Buenaventura Durruti, Cipriano Mera and Isaac Puente. After receiving amnesty from Alejandro Lerroux in April 1934, he actively participated in the Asturian Revolution, becoming secretary of the Gijón Revolutionary Committee (CRX). When the revolt was crushed, he fled through the mountains until in March 1935 he managed to reach France, where he remained until he was granted amnesty after the victory of the Popular Front in the 1936 general election.

When the coup d'état took place on July 18, 1936, he became a member of the Gijón War Committee, and later a fisheries councilor and representative of the Iberian Anarchist Federation (FAI) in the Sovereign Council of Asturias and León. After the fall of Asturias into the hands of the nationalist forces in 1937, he fled to Catalunya, where he acted as secretary of Segundo Blanco, the Minister of Education in the first Negrín government.

Exile
At the end of the civil war he fled to France and settled in Paris, where his first wife, Carmen Cadavieco, died shortly after. When the Wehrmacht troops occupied Paris in 1940 he fled to Orleans and from there to Chartres, where in 1942 he managed to gather around 500 exiled CNT militants and maintained contact with the French Resistance.

In 1945 he participated in the CNT Congress in Toulouse, where he restructured the Regional Committee of Asturias in exile. He also led the possibilist section (in favor of collaborating with the governments of the Spanish Republican government in exile) to split from the impossibilist sector headed by Germinal Esgleas Jaume and Federica Montseny. Finally the split was consummated and he became Secretary General of the possibilist CNT, until the 1st Regional Plenary held in Toulouse in December 1947. In 1949 he moved back to Paris.

At the end of the 1960s, together with UGT leaders, he founded the Unified Workers' Solidarity Fund to help imprisoned or fired workers.

Return to Asturias
He returned to Asturias for the first time in 1972 and, definitively, in 1976. Once returned, he participated in the different congresses of the CNT and in 1978 he was elected regional secretary for Asturias, also directing the magazine Acción Libertaria until 1994.

During the 5th congress of the union he defended the participation of the CNT in collective bargaining and union elections in works councils, opposing national leaders such as José Luis García Rúa. These discrepancies led him to break with the CNT and approach the General Confederation of Labor (CGT), of which he was one of the founders in 1989.

Works
 Eleuterio Quintanilla (vida y obra del maestro) (1973)
 Avelino González Mallada, alcalde anarquista (1986)
 José María Martínez. Símbolo ejemplar del obrerismo militante (1990)
 Historia negra de una crisis libertaria (1982)
 Rebelión militar y revolución en Asturias. Un protagonista libertario. (1995)

References

Bibliography

1913 births
2003 deaths
People from Asturias
Anarcho-syndicalists
Spanish anarchists
People from Gijón
Secretaries General of the Confederación Nacional del Trabajo